Lake Hāwea is a small settlement at the southern end of a lake, also named Lake Hāwea, in New Zealand's South Island. It is 18 kilometres to the northeast of Wānaka.

Demographics

Lake Hawea had a population of 1,200 at the 2018 New Zealand census, an increase of 402 people (50.4%) since the 2013 census, and an increase of 648 people (117.4%) since the 2006 census. There were 444 households. There were 630 males and 570 females, giving a sex ratio of 1.11 males per female. The median age was 39.4 years (compared with 37.4 years nationally), with 264 people (22.0%) aged under 15 years, 156 (13.0%) aged 15 to 29, 621 (51.8%) aged 30 to 64, and 159 (13.2%) aged 65 or older.

Ethnicities were 94.0% European/Pākehā, 8.5% Māori, 0.2% Pacific peoples, 2.5% Asian, and 3.2% other ethnicities (totals add to more than 100% since people could identify with multiple ethnicities).

The proportion of people born overseas was 25.0%, compared with 27.1% nationally.

Although some people objected to giving their religion, 66.2% had no religion, 25.0% were Christian and 2.8% had other religions.

Of those at least 15 years old, 258 (27.6%) people had a bachelor or higher degree, and 96 (10.3%) people had no formal qualifications. The median income was $36,500, compared with $31,800 nationally. 132 people (14.1%) earned over $70,000 compared to 17.2% nationally. The employment status of those at least 15 was that 519 (55.4%) people were employed full-time, 162 (17.3%) were part-time, and 15 (1.6%) were unemployed.

References 

Populated places in Otago
Queenstown-Lakes District
Populated lakeshore places in New Zealand